Stefen is a masculine given name. Notable people with the name include:

Stefen Fangmeier (born 1960), American director
Stefen Reid (born 1972), Canadian football player
Stefen Wisniewski (born 1989), American football player
Felipe Stefen (born 1995), Brazilian writer and photographer

Masculine given names